Římov is a municipality and village in Třebíč District in the Vysočina Region of the Czech Republic. It has about 400 inhabitants.

Administrative parts
Villages and hamlets of Branišovice, Dolní Stropnice, Dolní Vesce, Horní Vesce and Kladiny are administrative parts of Římov.

References

Villages in Třebíč District